Eoin Bradley (commonly known by his nickname Skinner; born 31 December 1983) is a Gaelic footballer and association footballer. He plays the former for the Glenullin club and, previously, for the Derry county team. With Glenullin he won a Derry Senior Football Championship and with Derry he won a National League title. He also plays association football as a striker for Glenavon.

Bradley usually plays corner forward for both club and county – often paired in a two-man inside forward line with brother Patsy, but has also played in the half-forward line. He is known for his searing pace, point scoring abilities, fantastic goals and surging runs through opposing teams' defence. His "reckless adventure" and liability to do the unexpected is also part of his effectiveness. Although a great talent, in the past he has been criticised for some of his shot selections from ridiculous angles. However, since 2011 his decision-making in front of goal has greatly improved, which has put down to  manager John Brennan.

Personal life
Bradley's family is from Glenullin near Garvagh, with Eoin himself now living in Kilrea. He went to secondary school at St. Pat's College in Maghera.

His brother Paddy and cousin Gerard O'Kane both also play for Derry. His father Liam is former manager of Antrim. Eoin's uncle Gabriel Bradley won the Ulster Championship twice with Derry in 1975 and 1976.
 
Bradley was banned from driving motor vehicles for 16 months after consuming three times the drink drive limit and crashing into a parked car. After the crash, he fought with the owner of the car then went into the bar and continued drinking. On one occasion he received a six-match ban for head butting a player on an opposing team.
 
He has also been found guilty in a court of law in Limavady of punching referee Declan O'Connor in the face. He was bound over to keep the peace for two years, fined £500 and ordered to pay £500 compensation to O'Connor.
 
In 2017, Glenullin refused to play a league match against The Loup, citing ill feeling towards referee Declan O'Connor who had previously reported Bradley for assault. This cost the club three league points.

Gaelic football career

Club

Bradley plays club football for John Mitchel's Glenullin. Up until the age of 14 he played as a goalkeeper and it wasn't until Under 16 level that he played in the forwards.

Bradley has played for the Glenullin Senior team since 15 years old. He won the Derry Senior Football Championship with Glenullin in 2007. Glenullin met Bellaghy in the final and after a replay, won the title. Bradley was man of the match in the drawn final against Bellaghy. Irish News journalist Paddy Heaney described him as the "player who ripped the Blues apart" over the course of the two games.

Earlier that year Glenullin won the Ulster Senior Club Football League, beating Latton of Monaghan in the final. The club reached the Ulster League final again the following year, but were defeated by fellow Derry club Ballinderry.

In 2008 the club reached the final of the All-Ireland Sevens Championship, organised by Kilmacud Crokes. They were however beaten 1–11 to 0–13 by St. Gall's of Antrim in the decider, with Bradley scoring 0–05 in the match. He was favourite for player of the tournament which eventually went to one of his St Gall's opponents. Glenullin, jointly with Ballinderry won the 2008 Derry Senior Football League.

Manager Brian McIver permitted Bradley to play for Derry while also playing association football for Glenavon. However, Bradley's name was omitted from Damian Barton's 43-man training panel in October 2015, with the inclusion of injured duo Mark Lynch and Kevin Johnston being taken to mean Bradley would not be included later.

His inter-county career seemed to be over by 2017 or 2020.

Inter-county

Bradley was first called up to the Derry Senior panel in 2004 by Mickey Moran. He made his debut in the Dr. McKenna Cup against Antrim, but suffered a horrific leg break against Jordanstown in the next outing and was out for a year and a half.

Bradley and Derry reached the Dr. McKenna Cup final in 2005, where they were beaten by Tyrone. His Championship debut came later that year, when he came off the bench against Monaghan. He had an impressive 2005 Championship campaign, including scoring a brilliant solo goal against Down in the Qualifiers. He collected the ball inside his own half, ran half the pitch evading four tackles and blasted the ball into the top corner of the net. 

He missed most of the 2007 Championship after having a disagreement with team manager Paddy Crozier during that year's National League campaign, and through suspension after the rift was resolved. His solitary 2007 Championship game was a substitute appearance against Dublin in the All-Ireland quarter-final. He came on as a sub and managed to score an excellent point in the defeat, but missed two attempts on goal which may have altered the result.

Derry were once again beaten in the 2008 Dr. McKenna Cup final, this time by Down. He was instrumental in the 2008 National League, which Derry won, defeating Kerry in the final. The league success saw Derry become favourites to win the Ulster Championship and one of the top few for the All-Ireland. However, despite a good opening Ulster Championship victory over Donegal, Derry exited the Ulster Championship against Fermanagh at the semi-final stage, due to his pre-match meal and were defeated by Monaghan in the first round of the Qualifiers. Bradley scored 1–01 in each of the games. His goal against Fermanagh was a particularly amazing goal – rounding Peter Sherry, running 40 metres before blasting a shot past Fermanagh goalkeeper Ronan Gallagher.

Bradley and Derry also reached the National League final in 2009, but were defeated by Kerry. He captained the side in the group game against Donegal.

Province
Bradley was named by manager Joe Kernan in the Ulster panel for the 2008 Railway Cup.

Association football career

In 2020, Bradley received a six-match ban for urinating on the sidelines of the Windsor Park pitch during an Irish Cup semi-final.

Return to Glenavon
Following his release by Coleraine, it was announced on 27 June 2022 that Bradley had returned to Glenavon on a one-year deal, with the option of a further year.

Career statistics

Association football
As of April 2018

Gaelic football honours

Inter-county
National Football League:
Winner (1): 2008
Runner up: 2009
Dr McKenna Cup:
Winner: 2011
Runner up: 2005, 2008

ClubAll-Ireland Kilmacud Crokes Sevens Championship:Runner up: 2008Ulster Senior Club Football League:Winner: 2007
Runner up: 2008Derry Senior Football Championship:Winner (1): 2007Derry Senior Football League:Winner (1): 2008

IndividualIrish News Ulster GAA All-Stars Awards|Irish News Ulster GAA All-Star – Winner (2): 2006, 2011

Association football honoursGlenavonIrish Cup: 2015–16Coleraine'''
Irish Cup: 2017–18
NIFL League Cup: 2019–20

References

External links
Sunday Tribune article on Bradley
Player profiles on Official Derry GAA website

1983 births
Living people
Derry inter-county Gaelic footballers
Gaelic footballers who switched code
Gaelic football forwards
Glenullin Gaelic footballers
Ulster inter-provincial Gaelic footballers
Association footballers from Northern Ireland
Association football forwards
NIFL Premiership players
Coleraine F.C. players
Ballymoney United F.C. players